Lake Alpine is a reservoir in Alpine County, California, formed by Alpine Dam on Silver Creek.  It is located east of Bear Valley in the Sierra Nevada range. It sits at 7,303 feet (2,227 m) above mean sea level and is a popular spot for outdoor activities, such as boating and hiking in the summer, and snowmobiling and skiing in the winter, although it may be inaccessible at times due to snow.
California State Route 4 passes to the north of Lake Alpine between Bear Valley and the Pacific Grade Summit.

See also
List of dams and reservoirs in California
List of lakes in California

References

External links
Lake Alpine informational web site

Reservoirs in California
Reservoirs in Alpine County, California
Lake Alpine
Reservoirs in Northern California